Kévin Olimpa (born 10 March 1988) is a retired Martiniquais professional footballer, who played as a goalkeeper.

Career
Olimpa previously played for French side Bordeaux. He made his debut for the side on 8 November 2008, coming on in the 43rd minute to replace injured starter Mathieu Valverde in Bordeaux's 2–0 win over AJ Auxerre.

In November 2016, he agreed the termination of his contract with Greek Superleague side Platanias F.C.

In December 2018, he moved to French lower-league club Espace Foot Bordeaux-Mérignac.

In January 2019, Olimpa joined Andorran side Sant Julià.

Honours
Bordeaux
Ligue 1: 2008–09
Coupe de France: 2012–13

References

External links

 

1988 births
Living people
Footballers from Paris
French people of Martiniquais descent
Association football goalkeepers
French footballers
France under-21 international footballers
Martiniquais footballers
Martinique international footballers
Ligue 1 players
Ligue 2 players
Super League Greece players
Primera Divisió players
INF Clairefontaine players
FC Girondins de Bordeaux players
Angers SCO players
Platanias F.C. players
UE Sant Julià players
2013 CONCACAF Gold Cup players
2014 Caribbean Cup players
2017 CONCACAF Gold Cup players